Billerbeck (Westphalian: Billerbiëk) is a municipality in the district of Coesfeld in North Rhine-Westphalia in Germany.

Geography

Neighbor towns/cities
Billerbeck has boundaries to Rosendahl, Laer, Altenberge, Havixbeck, Nottuln and Coesfeld.

City Districts
 Stadt Billerbeck,
 Kirchspiel Billerbeck (until 1969)
 Beerlage (until 1969)

Growth due to law acts
On 1 July 1969 the town's surrounding areas: Alstätte, Bockelsdorf, Bombeck, Dörholt, Gantweg, Gerleve, Hamern, !'Lutum, Osthellen, Osthellermark and Westhellen - each part of former "Kirchspiel Aulendorf", Esking, Langenhorst und Temming - each part of former Beerlage - were merged with Billerbeck.

Politics

Town council

26 Seats  of the town council were given to different parties at local elections on 26 September 2004:
 Christian Democratic Union (CDU) 14 Seats
 Social Democratic Party of Germany (SPD) 10 Seats
 Alliance '90/The Greens 2 Seats

Coat of Arms
The Coat of Arms shows the three rivers Berkel, Haulingbach and Lilienbeck in silver on blue background.  Its origin can be traced back to the medieval Knights of Billerbeck.

Sister city
Englewood, Ohio

Culture and Sights

Theatre
In 1950 the citizens Alex Hesselmann and Bernhard Engbers founded the open air-theatre of Billerbeck.  It is well known for its high class acting, given that there are only non-professional actors.

Museums
The Kolvenburg comprises building parts from the 15th and 16th centuries. This kind of mansion with its half-hipp roof is a typical housing of the lower nobility of the Münsterland. Today it is the cultural centre of the district of Coesfeld showing changing exhibitions.

Buildings
 St. Ludgerus Church
 Cath. Church of St. Johannis
 Kolvenburg
 Town Hall, Markt 1. Neogothic building with blending made of sandstone, 1891, erected by Hilger Hertel. Enlargement in 1948/49.
 Haus Beckebans
 Richthof
 Gerleve Abbey
 Haus Hameren (Inh: Baron Twickel zu Degenhart)
 Former residence of the Arch Deacon of Billerbeck, Johanniskirchplatz 11. L-formed massive building with hipped roof, in earlier times surrounded by water. The oldest parts were erected in the early 16th century and enlarged in 1679.
 Ludgerus-fountain
 Marien chapel Aulendorf
 Evang. church centre
 "Alte Landwirtschaftsschule" (former agricultural college), Billerbeck's cultural center
 Ludgerus-Stift, an old hospital now used as old people's homeOld buildings that were lived in'''
street: MÜNSTERSTR. 4.: 16th century
MÜNSTERSTR. 8.: 16th century or earlier.
MÜNSTERSTR. 16.: the northern part and the back are from the 16th century. Inside there is a chimney/fireplace from 1693 in a late renaissance style
MÜNSTERSTR. 25.: The backhouse dates to the 16th century.
The old church of St. Johannis (from 1234) is completely surrounded by simple styled half-timbered buildings (little storage buildings). The oldest date from the late medieval age but have been re-arranged several times. Street: JOHANNSIKIRCHHOF 2, 1513 d. - Nr. 7, 1492 d.

Parks
 Longinusturm in the "treehills" Baumbergen
 Berkel-Auen (the river Berkel starts here)
 Leisure- and Sports Centre Helker Berg

Economy and Infrastructure

Traffic
Billerbeck can be reached by car via the autobahn. From north-east on autobahn A1 at interchange "Havixbeck/Billerbeck", from south on autobahn A43 at interchange "Nottuln/Billerbeck", from west on autobahn A31 at interchange "Coesfeld".

Public Transport
Billerbeck is located on the train line from Münster to Coesfeld, the so-called "tree hills line" ("Baumbergebahn").  The modernised station building offers a café for cultural Events and a bicycle rental station.

A further train station in Billerbeck is located in Lutum, which is a countryside train station.  The town of Billerbeck is part of the public transport association of the Münsterland VGM. Therefore, some bus lines also stop at Billerbeck, connecting the town to its neighbouring towns and cities.

Business
The biggest employer in Billerbeck is the company Dr. Suwelack founded by Wolfgang Suwelack and which employs 410 staff.  It is working on the sector of nutrition production and skin care.  It is also operating one of the most advanced and biggest nutrition shockfrosting sites in Europe.
A medium-sized metal-working industry can be found there as well as several trading companies, and service industry (e.g. 7 haircutters, 3 undertakers and a filmproduction company).

Billerbeck is an important centre of tourism as it is only half-an-hour away for the 7 million people of the Rhein-Ruhr-Area and it is also a place of pilgrimage as Ludger, the first bishop of Münster, died there in the year 809. Last but not least cycling is very popular in the region which is manifested in 800 kilometres of bicycle and pedestrian streets.  For these reasons the gastronomy is well developed and offers a great variety related to the city's number of inhabitants.

Hotels / Restaurants / Bistros:

 Restaurant Hahnenkamp
 Hotel Weißenburg
 Domschenke Groll
 Tagungshotel Billerbecker Hof
 Bürgerhaus Möllmann-Daldrup
 Hotel Homoet
 Cox Orange
 u.a.

Cafés:

 Billerbeck's Bahnhof
 Domcafé Frede
 Eiscafé de Fanti
 Café Kunstleben
 and further more

Education
In Billerbeck there are the Grundschule (basic school - school years 1-4) at two locations, the Realschule (secondary modern school/junior high - 5-10) and a Hauptschule (secondary school - 5-10). 5 Kindergartens and 2 day care units are operated in the city.

Religion
In Billerbeck there are Roman Catholic and Lutheran churches present.

The Catholic Pfarr- und Propsteigemeinde St. Johann / St. Ludgerus Billerbeck has its roots in the 8th century.

Very renowned and with great importance far ahead of Billerbeck there is the abbey of Benedictine- St. Joseph at Billerbeck-Gerleve. It is part of the Beuron congregation and since 1999 has been led by prior Pius Engelbert O.S.B. The abbey also contains a house for retreat, a youth education unit, and a religious book store.

The Lutheran church centre (Protestant) "Vom guten Hirten" (of the good shepherd) in Billerbeck is a modern style church with affiliated centre of parish.

Literature
 Westfälischer Städteatlas''; Band: VI; 1 Teilband. Im Auftrage der Historischen Kommission für Westfalen und mit Unterstützung des Landschaftsverbandes Westfalen-Lippe, hrsg. von Heinz Stoob † und Wilfried Ehbrecht. Stadtmappe Billerbeck, Author: Peter Ilisch. ; Dortmund-Altenbeken, 1999.
Peter Ilisch, Zur Siedlungsgenese von Billerbeck. Westfälische Zeitschrift 129, 1979, S. 9-56.
Peter Ilisch, Zum Erscheinungsbild münsterländischer Kirchhöfe vor 1800 - Das Beispiel St. Johann zu Billerbeck. Geschichtsblätter des Kreises Coesfeld 4, 1979, S. 114-131.
Peter Ilisch, Die Vikarien zu Billerbeck. Geschichtsblätter des Kreises Coesfeld 28, 2003, S. 1-25.

Clubs, societies, groups, institutions

 DJK-VfL Billerbeck (sports club - football, tennis, athletics etc.)
 Katholische Landjugend Bewegung Billerbeck (Catholic youth movement billerbeck)
 Bürgerschützenverein Aulendorf
 Capellengemeinde-Aulendorf
 Freilichtbühne Billerbeck
 Förderverein Domorgel Billerbeck
 Förderverein Mahnmal
 Deutsches Rotes Kreuz Ortverein Billerbeck
 KJG-Ferienwerk Billerbeck
 Kolpingsfamilie Billerbeck
 Suwelack-Stiftung
 Tennisclub Billerbeck
 Sister-City-Club Billerbeck

Personalities from Billerbeck 

 Josef Suwelack (1850-1929), entrepreneur and pioneer
 Helmut Elfring (born 1933), politician
 Margret Mergen (born 1961), politician (CDU), Lord Mayor of Baden-Baden since 2014

References

External links
 Billerbeck im Kulturatlas Westfalen
 Billerbeck, Peter - Georgetown University  Homepage

Coesfeld (district)